Home is the 14th studio album by Scottish singer, Sheena Easton, and was released on March 20, 1999 by Universal Victor for the Japanese market only where it charted at #97. The disc consists of six tracks of new material and four cover versions from Crosby, Stills, Nash & Young, Paul Simon, Curtis Stigers and Stephen Sondheim. Easton self produced and arranged on 9 of the albums tracks. 

"Carry A Dream" was the first single release, and was used as the theme song for Japanese animated movie Marco. "My Treasure is You" was issued as the follow-up in the latter part of 1999.

Track listings
 "Our House" (Graham Nash) - 3:12
 "St. Judy's Comet" (Paul Simon) - 3:35
 "Moon" (Jana Anderson) - 4:07
 "Something Good" (Danny Jacob, Janis Liebhart) - 3:29
 "Never Saw A Miracle" (Barry Mann, Curtis Stigers) - 5:23
 "Not While I'm Around" (Stephen Sondheim) - 3:08
 "Who Knows?" (Sally Dworsky, Scott Axiana Wilk) - 4:25
 "Take Me Home" (John Capek, Marc Jordan, Steve Kipner) - 4:32
 "My Treasure is You" (Tommy Snyder, Kenichi Shono) - 5:20
 "Carry a Dream" (Linda Hennrick, Taro Iwashiro) - 4:34

Production
Producer 
Danny Jacob (tracks: 1-8)
Kenichi Shono (track: 9)
Sheena Easton (tracks: 1-9) 
Taro Iwashiro (track: 10)

Personnel
Management: Harriet Wasserman
Emmis Management Production Coordinator: Harriet Wasserman
Photography: Randee St. Nicholas
Stylist: Gitte Meldgaard
Hair & Makeup: Terri Apanasewicz
Art work: T "Rastaman" Minegishi

References

Home: Sheena Easton

1999 albums
Sheena Easton albums